Berglsteiner See is a lake of Tyrol, Austria. The lake is located on 713 m height in Breitenbach am Inn in a depression of the south slope of the Voldöppberg (1,509 m), which is part of the Brandenberg Alps.

External links

Lakes of Tyrol (state)